Teleochilus royanus is a species of sea snail, a marine gastropod mollusk in the family Raphitomidae.

Description
The length of the shell attains 16 mm, its diameter 6.5 mm.

The apical whorls are minutely punctate and the succeeding whorls are obsoletely longitudinally ribbed and transversely scratched, a couple of transverse ridges being more prominent below the suture, which is slightly canaliculate. The aperture is longer than the spire.

This is the most interesting species found by Roy Bell, and, until the animal is examined, its classification must remain obscure. As noted above, the only specimens I have seen were dead, but this may be the same thing as recorded
by Gatliff and Gabriel from Bass Straits as Baphnohela sp., in which case live specimens may soon turn up.

The genus Teleochilus was subordinated by Maurice Cossmann, who was followed by Tate, to Daphnobela, a genus proposed for a Bartonian Eocene fossil, which seems to have no relationship.

Distribution
This marine species is endemic to Australia and occurs off New South Wales and Victoria.

References

 Laseron, C. 1954. Revision of the New South Wales Turridae (Mollusca). Australian Zoological Handbook. Sydney : Royal Zoological Society of New South Wales pp. 56, pls 1–12. 
 Powell, A.W.B. 1966. The molluscan families Speightiidae and Turridae, an evaluation of the valid taxa, both Recent and fossil, with list of characteristic species. Bulletin of the Auckland Institute and Museum. Auckland, New Zealand 5: 1–184, pls 1–23

External links
 

royanus
Gastropods described in 1924
Gastropods of Australia